Leonard Ross "Mick" Dittman (born 2 July 1952 in Rockhampton Queensland) is a retired Australian Racing Hall of Fame jockey.

Nicknamed "The Enforcer" due to his strong use of the whip, he was renowned for his vigour and strength in a tight finish. He rose to become one of the best jockeys in the country.

Some of the achievements during his career included winning the Melbourne Cup (Gurner's Lane), three Golden Slippers (Full On Aces, Bounding Away and Bint Marscay), two Cox Plates (Red Anchor and Strawberry Road) and a Caulfield Cup (Sydeston).

During a career spanning more than thirty years in the saddle it is estimated he has won more than 1,700 races (which included 88 Group 1 races) and through his partnership with trainer Tommy Smith also won three Sydney Jockey Premierships.

Mick Dittman was inducted in the Australian Racing Hall of Fame in 2002.

References

External links
Australian Racing Museum Hall Of Fame Official Site

Australian jockeys
Australian Thoroughbred Racing Hall of Fame inductees
1952 births
Living people
Sportspeople from Rockhampton
Sportsmen from Queensland